The Los Angeles Lynx are a 2007 expansion team from the National Indoor Football League (NIFL).  They played their home games at the Industry Hills Expo Center in Industry, California (a suburb of Los Angeles).

This was one of a number of teams that were dissolved by the NIFL in a mid-season purge during its inaugural season.  The Lynx's last game was a home loss to the San Diego Shockwave on April 28, 2007.

External links
Official website

National Indoor Football League teams
Lynx
City of Industry, California
American football teams established in 2006
American football teams disestablished in 2007
2006 establishments in California
2007 disestablishments in California